Point of View or Points of View may refer to:

Concept and technique
 Point of view (philosophy),  an attitude how one sees or thinks of something
 Point of view (literature) or narrative mode, the perspective of the narrative voice; the pronoun used in narration
 Point of view (painting), the angle of painter vision
 Point of view (pornography), a subset of gonzo pornography in which the performer also holds the camera
 Point-of-view shot, a technique in motion photography

Organizations
 Point of View, Inc., a video game developer
 Point of View (computer hardware company), a producer of gaming graphics cards
 Point of View Movie Production Co. Ltd., of Hong Kong filmmaker Dennis Law Sau-Yiu

Geography
 Point of View Park, a parklet in Pittsburgh, Pennsylvania, US
 Pointe of View Winery, a winery in North Dakota, US

Art
 Point of View (Passmore), an art installation by Matthew Passmore in San Francisco, California, and Haifa, Israel
 Point of View (West), a 2006 public sculpture by James A. West of George Washington and Guyasuta
 Points of View (Surls), a 1991 sculpture by James Surls, in Houston, Texas, US

Literature
Point of View, a 1912 play by Jules Eckert Goodman
 The Point of View of My Work as an Author, an 1859 philosophical autobiography by the Danish philosopher Søren Kierkegaard
 "Point of View" (short story), by Isaac Asimov published in 1979
 Points of View (essay), an essay by W. Somerset Maugham
 Point of View (magazine), national magazine of the Documentary Organization of Canada
 "Point of View", a short story by Damon Knight and illustrated by Chris Van Allsburg

Film, television, and radio
 Point of View (film), a 1965 documentary film
 "Point of View" (Stargate SG-1), an episode of the television series
 POV (TV series), a PBS television program that features independent nonfiction films
 Points of View (TV programme), a British viewer opinion television series
 Point of View (radio show), a former talk show hosted by Marlin Maddoux, renamed POVe With Kerby Anderson
 Point of View (Indonesian TV programme), a Indonesian viewer opinion television series broadcast by SCTV
 A Point of View (radio programme), a weekly BBC Radio 4 programme in which a guest speaker reflects about a topical issue

Games
 Point of View (video game), a 2001 game, see List of interactive movies
 POV hat, part of a joystick

Music

Albums
 Point of View (Cassandra Wilson album), 1986
 Point of View (Spyro Gyra album), 1989
 Points of View (album), a 1998 album by jazz bassist Dave Holland

Songs
 "Point of View" (DB Boulevard song), a single by DB Boulevard
 "Point of View" (Fates Warning song), a 1991 single by the progressive metal band Fates Warning
"Point of View" (Matumbi song), 1979
"Point of View", a 2007 song by Tiny Masters of Today with Kimya Dawson
"(A) Point of View", a 1970 song by José Feliciano

See also
 POV (disambiguation)
 "Point of You", a 2014 single by the post punk revival band Phase
 Viewpoint (disambiguation)
 Perspective (disambiguation)
 View model (disambiguation)
 View (disambiguation)